WBSM (1420 AM) is a radio station broadcasting in the New Bedford–Fall River market area with a news/talk/sports format. WBSM is under ownership of Townsquare Media, with studios in Fairhaven shared with WFHN.

News and weather
WBSM had a five-person news team in 2016, headed by Taylor Cormier. Anchors and reporters were Cormier, Tim Weisberg, Greg Desrosiers, Jim Phillips and Jim Marshall. Following the departure of Desroisers and Marshall, the station’s news team added Tim Weisberg as afternoon news anchor, and Tim Dunn as a reporter.

Cormier departed the WBSM newsroom in May 2019, joining the Howie Carr Show as the political talk program’s producer.

Over the past year, the station’s news department has seen frequent changes, ultimately dwindling down to a newsroom staffed by just two people as of November 2019.

The station is an affiliate of ABC News Radio for national and world news. Local weather reports are provided by ABC television affiliate WLNE-TV.

Talk and sports
Local personalities include Phil Paleologos, Brian Thomas, Barry Richard, Ken Pittman, Chris McCarthy, Tim Weisberg and Marcus Ferro. Syndicated programs include First Light, The Howie Carr Show, The Mark Levin Show, Jim Bohannon, Hugh Hewitt and Michael Medved.

The station broadcasts Boston Red Sox & New England Patriots games.

Notable alumni
 André Bernier: Weekend weather anchor (1975–1977). André was the first weather anchor seen on The Weather Channel and currently with WJW in Cleveland, Ohio.
 Pete Braley: morning show host and program director (1989-2014),
 Henry Carreiro: Daytime talk show host during the 1970s, 1980s and 1990s, he also had a speaking role in Jaws as a loudmouth fisherman who among other one-liners tells Matt Hooper to "walk straight ahead" in response to the question about a good hotel or restaurant on the island. (deceased)
 Don Gillis: Sports director (1949–1951), commentator for Red Sox, Boston Celtics, and Bruins broadcasts on WHDH AM 850 (now WEEI) (1950s-1960s), sports director for Channel 5 Boston (1962–1983), host of Candlepin Bowling (1967–1996) (deceased)
 Hal Peterson: Host of "Open Line" from the mid-1950s and thru various periods in the 1960s and 1970s. Hal was the creator of the long-running charity "Quarters for Christmas". It was Hal Peterson that was responsible for giving Gil Santos his first job in radio as Hal's "Color Man" during New Bedford High School basketball broadcasts. (deceased)
 Jack Peterson: news anchor, play-by-play announcer for local sports (1998-2014) (deceased)
 Stan Lipp: Host of "Open Line" from 1964-2001. (deceased)
 Gil Santos: Sports reporter (1950s), play-by-play announcer for Patriots radio broadcasts (1966–2013) (deceased)

References

1992 Broadcasting Yearbook, page A-166

External links
WBSM's Official Site

News and talk radio stations in the United States
BSM
New Bedford, Massachusetts
Mass media in Bristol County, Massachusetts
Radio stations established in 1949
1949 establishments in Massachusetts
Townsquare Media radio stations